South Korean pop rock band Day6 have released four studio albums, one live album, two compilation albums, seven extended plays and twenty-four singles.

Albums

Studio albums

Live albums

Compilation albums

Extended plays

Singles

As lead artist

Soundtrack appearances

Other charted songs

See also
JYP Entertainment discography

Notes

References

Discographies of South Korean artists
Rock music group discographies
K-pop music group discographies